The 1978 Lehigh Engineers football team was an American football team that represented Lehigh University as an independent during the 1978 NCAA Division I-AA football season.

In their third year under head coach John Whitehead, the Engineers compiled an 8–3 record. Bill Bradley and Pete DeLuca were the team captains.

Lehigh had won the NCAA Division II Football Championship in 1977, and in 1978 the Engineers moved up to the newly formed Division I-AA, later to be renamed the Football Championship Subdivision. Also moving up from Division II, and competing as I-AA independents, were in-state rivals Bucknell and Lafayette. The Engineers' 1978 schedule included opponents from Division I-A, Division I-AA, Division II and Division III.

Lehigh played its home games at Taylor Stadium on the university's main campus in Bethlehem, Pennsylvania.

Schedule

Rankings

References

Lehigh
Lehigh Mountain Hawks football seasons
Lehigh Engineers football